Manatees (family Trichechidae, genus Trichechus) are large, fully aquatic, mostly herbivorous marine mammals sometimes known as sea cows. There are three accepted living species of Trichechidae, representing three of the four living species in the order Sirenia: the Amazonian manatee (Trichechus inunguis), the West Indian manatee (Trichechus manatus), and the West African manatee (Trichechus senegalensis).

Manatees are herbivores and eat over 60 different freshwater and saltwater plants. Manatees inhabit the shallow, marshy coastal areas and rivers of the Caribbean Sea, the Gulf of Mexico, the Amazon basin, and West Africa.

The main causes of death for manatees are human-related issues, such as habitat destruction and human objects. Their slow-moving, curious nature has led to violent collisions with propeller-driven boats and ships. Some manatees have been found with over 50 scars on them from propeller blades. Natural causes of death include adverse temperatures, predation by crocodiles on young, and disease.

Etymology 
The etymology of the name is unclear, with connections having been made to Latin  "hand" and to pre-Columbian Taíno manati "breast". The term sea cow is a reference to the species' slow, peaceful, herbivorous nature, reminiscent of that of bovines.

Taxonomy
Manatees are three of the four living species in the order Sirenia. The fourth is the Eastern Hemisphere's dugong. The Sirenia are thought to have evolved from four-legged land mammals more than 60 million years ago, with the closest living relatives being the Proboscidea (elephants) and Hyracoidea (hyraxes).

Description

At birth, baby manatees weigh about  each. The female manatee has two teats, one under each flipper, a characteristic that was used to make early links between the manatee and elephants.

The lids of manatees' small, widely spaced eyes close in a circular manner. The manatee has a large, flexible, prehensile upper lip, used to gather food and eat and for social interaction and communication. Manatees have shorter snouts than their fellow sirenians, the dugongs.

Manatee adults have no incisor or canine teeth, just a set of cheek teeth, which are not clearly differentiated into molars and premolars. These teeth are repeatedly replaced throughout life, with new teeth growing at the rear as older teeth fall out from farther forward in the mouth, somewhat as elephants' teeth do. At any time, a manatee typically has no more than six teeth in each jaw of its mouth.

The manatee's tail is paddle-shaped, and is the clearest visible difference between manatees and dugongs; a dugong tail is fluked, similar in shape to that of a whale.

The manatee is unusual among mammals in having just six cervical vertebrae, a number that may be due to mutations in the homeotic genes. All other mammals have seven cervical vertebrae, other than the two-toed and three-toed sloths.

Like the horse, the manatee has a simple stomach, but a large cecum, in which it can digest tough plant matter. Generally, the intestines are about 45 meters, unusually long for an animal of the manatee's size.

Evolution 
Fossil remains of manatee ancestors - also known as sirenians - date back to the Early Eocene. It is thought that they reached the isolated area of the South American continent and became known as Trichechidae. In the Late Miocene, trichechids were likely restricted in South American coastal rivers and they fed on many freshwater plants. Dugongs inhabited the West Atlantic and Caribbean waters and fed on seagrass meadows instead. As the sea grasses began to grow, manatees adapted to the changing environment by growing supernumerary molars. Sea levels lowered and increased erosion and silt runoff was caused by glaciation. This increased the tooth wear of the bottom-feeding manatees.

Behavior

Apart from mothers with their young, or males following a receptive female, manatees are generally solitary animals. Manatees spend approximately 50% of the day sleeping submerged, surfacing for air regularly at intervals of less than 20 minutes. The Florida subspecies (T. m. latirostris) has been known to live up to 60 years.

Locomotion

Intelligence and learning

Manatees are capable of understanding discrimination tasks and show signs of complex associative learning. They also have good long-term memory. They demonstrate discrimination and task-learning abilities similar to dolphins and pinnipeds in acoustic and visual studies. Social interactions between manatees are highly complex and intricate, which may indicate higher intelligence than previously thought, although they remain poorly understood by science.

Reproduction
Manatees typically breed once every two years; generally only a single calf is born. Gestation lasts about 12 months and to wean the calf takes a further 12 to 18 months, although females may have more than one estrous cycle per year.

Communication
Manatees emit a wide range of sounds used in communication, especially between cows and their calves. Their ears are large internally but the external openings are small, and they are located four inches behind each eye. Adults communicate to maintain contact and during sexual and play behaviors. Taste and smell, in addition to sight, sound, and touch, may also be forms of communication.

Diet
Manatees are herbivores and eat over 60 different freshwater (e.g., floating hyacinth, pickerel weed, alligator weed, water lettuce, hydrilla, water celery, musk grass, mangrove leaves) and saltwater plants (e.g., sea grasses, shoal grass, manatee grass, turtle grass, widgeon grass, sea clover, and marine algae). Using their divided upper lip, an adult manatee will commonly eat up to 10%–15% of their body weight (about 50 kg) per day. Consuming such an amount requires the manatee to graze for up to seven hours a day. To be able to cope with the high levels of cellulose in their plant based diet, manatees utilize hindgut fermentation to help with the digestion process. Manatees have been known to eat small numbers of fish from nets.

Feeding behavior

Manatees use their flippers to "walk" along the bottom whilst they dig for plants and roots in the substrate. When plants are detected, the flippers are used to scoop the vegetation toward the manatee's lips. The manatee has prehensile lips; the upper lip pad is split into left and right sides which can move independently. The lips use seven muscles to manipulate and tear at plants. Manatees use their lips and front flippers to move the plants into the mouth. The manatee does not have front teeth, however, behind the lips, on the roof of the mouth, there are dense, ridged pads. These horny ridges, and the manatee's lower jaw, tear through ingested plant material.

Dentition
Manatees have four rows of teeth. There are 6 to 8 high-crowned, open-rooted molars located along each side of the upper and lower jaw giving a total of 24 to 32 flat, rough-textured teeth. Eating gritty vegetation abrades the teeth, particularly the enamel crown; however, research indicates that the enamel structure in manatee molars is weak. To compensate for this, manatee teeth are continually replaced. When anterior molars wear down, they are shed. Posterior molars erupt at the back of the row and slowly move forward to replace these like enamel crowns on a conveyor belt, similarly to elephants. This process continues throughout the manatee's lifetime. The rate at which the teeth migrate forward depends on how quickly the anterior teeth abrade. Some studies indicate that the rate is about 1 cm/month although other studies indicate 0.1 cm/month.

Ecology

Range and habitat

Manatees inhabit the shallow, marshy coastal areas and rivers of the Caribbean Sea and the Gulf of Mexico (T. manatus, West Indian manatee), the Amazon basin (T. inunguis, Amazonian manatee), and West Africa (T. senegalensis, West African manatee).

West Indian manatees prefer warmer temperatures and are known to congregate in shallow waters. They frequently migrate through brackish water estuaries to freshwater springs. They cannot survive below 15 °C (60 °F). Their natural source for warmth during winter is warm, spring-fed rivers.

West Indian
The coast of the state of Georgia is usually the northernmost range of the West Indian manatees because their low metabolic rate does not protect them in cold water. Prolonged exposure to water below 20 °C (68 °F) can cause "cold stress syndrome" and death.

Florida manatees can move freely between fresh water and salt water.

Manatees have been seen as far north as Cape Cod, and in 1995 and again in 2006, one was seen in New York City and Rhode Island's Narragansett Bay. A manatee was spotted in the Wolf River harbor near the Mississippi River in downtown Memphis in 2006, and was later found dead  downriver in McKellar Lake. Another manatee was found dead on a New Jersey beach in February 2020, considered especially unusual given the time of year. At the time of the manatee's discovery, the water temperature in the area was below 6.5 °C (43.7 °F).

The West Indian manatee migrates into Florida rivers—such as the Crystal, the Homosassa, and the Chassahowitzka rivers, whose headsprings are 22 °C (72 °F) all year. Between November and March each year, about 600 West Indian manatees gather in the rivers in Citrus County, Florida such as the Crystal River National Wildlife Refuge.

In winter, manatees often gather near the warm-water outflows of power plants along the Florida coast, instead of migrating south as they once did. Some conservationists are concerned that these manatees have become too reliant on these artificially warmed areas. The U.S. Fish and Wildlife Service is trying to find a new way to heat the water for manatees that depended on plants that have closed.

Studies suggest that Florida manatees need access to fresh water for proper regulation of water and salts in their bodies.

Accurate population estimates of the West Indian manatee in Florida are difficult. They have been called scientifically weak because they vary widely from year to year, with most areas showing decreases, and little strong evidence of increases except in two areas. Manatee counts are highly variable without an accurate way to estimate numbers. In Florida in 1996, a winter survey found 2,639 manatees; in 1997, a January survey found 2,229, and a February survey found 1,706. A statewide synoptic survey in January 2010 found 5,067 manatees living in Florida, the highest number recorded to that time.

As of January 2016, the USFWS estimates the range-wide West Indian manatee population to be at least 13,000; as of January 2018, at least 6,100 are estimated to be in Florida.

Population viability studies conducted in 1997 found that decreasing adult survival and eventual extinction were probable future outcomes for Florida manatees unless they received more protection. The U.S. Fish and Wildlife Service proposed downgrading the manatee's status from endangered to threatened in January 2016 after more than 40 years.

Amazonian
The freshwater Amazonian manatee (T. inunguis) inhabits the Central Amazon Basin in Brazil, eastern Perú, southeastern Colombia, but not Ecuador. It is the only exclusively freshwater manatee, and is also the smallest. Since they are unable to reduce peripheral heat loss, it is found primarily in tropical waters.

West African
They are found in coastal marine and estuarine habitats, and in freshwater river systems along the west coast of Africa from the Senegal River south to the Cuanza River in Angola. They live as far upriver on the Niger River as Koulikoro in Mali,  from the coast.

Predation
In relation to the threat posed by humans, predation does not present a significant threat to manatees. When threatened, the manatee's response is to dive as deeply as it can, suggesting that threats have most frequently come from land dwellers such as humans rather than from other water-dwelling creatures such as caimans or sharks.

Relation to humans

Threats
The main causes of death for manatees are human-related issues, such as habitat destruction and human objects. Natural causes of death include adverse temperatures, predation by crocodiles on young, and disease.

Ship strikes
Their slow-moving, curious nature, coupled with dense coastal development, has led to many violent collisions with propeller-driven boats and ships, leading frequently to maiming, disfigurement, and even death. As a result, a large proportion of manatees exhibit spiral cutting propeller scars on their backs, usually caused by larger vessels that do not have skegs in front of the propellers like the smaller outboard and inboard-outboard recreational boats have. They are now even identified by humans based on their scar patterns. Many manatees have been cut in two by large vessels like ships and tug boats, even in the highly populated lower St. Johns River's narrow channels. Some are concerned that the current situation is inhumane, with upwards of 50 scars and disfigurements from vessel strikes on a single manatee. Often, the lacerations lead to infections, which can prove fatal. Internal injuries stemming from being trapped between hulls and docks and impacts have also been fatal. Recent testing shows that manatees may be able to hear speed boats and other watercraft approaching, due to the frequency the boat makes. However, a manatee may not be able to hear the approaching boats when they are performing day-to-day activities or distractions. The manatee has a tested frequency range of 8 to 32 kilohertz.

Manatees hear on a higher frequency than would be expected for such large marine mammals. Many large boats emit very low frequencies, which confuse the manatee and explain their lack of awareness around boats. The Lloyd's mirror effect results in low frequency propeller sounds not being discernible near the surface, where most accidents occur. Research indicates that when a boat has a higher frequency the manatees rapidly swim away from danger.

In 2003, a population model was released by the United States Geological Survey that predicted an extremely grave situation confronting the manatee in both the Southwest and Atlantic regions where the vast majority of manatees are found. It states,
According to marine mammal veterinarians:

These veterinarians go on to state:

One quarter of annual manatee deaths in Florida are caused by boat collisions with manatees. In 2009, of the 429 Florida manatees recorded dead, 97 were killed by commercial and recreational vessels, which broke the earlier record number of 95 set in 2002.

Red tide
Another cause of manatee deaths are red tides, a term used for the proliferation, or "blooms", of the microscopic marine algae Karenia brevis. This dinoflagellate produces brevetoxins that can have toxic effects on the central nervous system of animals.

In 1996, a red tide was responsible for 151 manatee deaths in Florida. The bloom was present from early March to the end of April and killed approximately 15% of the known population of manatees along South Florida's western coast.
Other blooms in 1982 and 2005 resulted in 37 and 44 deaths, respectively.

Starvation
In 2021 a massive die-off of seagrass along the Atlantic coast of Florida left manatees without enough food to eat. As a result of this ecological disaster Florida's manatees began dying at an alarming rate, largely from starvation. In early 2022 the U.S. Fish and Wildlife Service began a feeding program to address the situation by distributing 3,000 pounds (1,361 kg) of lettuce per day to save the malnourished animals.

Additional threats
Manatees can also be crushed and isolated in water control structures (navigation locks, floodgates, etc.) and are occasionally killed by entanglement in fishing gear, such as crab pot float lines, box traps, and shark nets.

While humans are allowed to swim with manatees in one area of Florida, there have been numerous charges of people harassing and disturbing the manatees. According to the United States Fish and Wildlife Service, approximately 99 manatee deaths each year are related to human activities. In January 2016, there were 43 manatee deaths in Florida alone.

Conservation
All three species of manatee are listed by the World Conservation Union as vulnerable to extinction. However, The U.S. Fish and Wildlife Service (FWS) does not consider the West Indian manatee to be "endangered" anymore, having downgraded its status to "threatened" as of March 2017. They cite improvements to habitat conditions, population growth and reductions of threats as reasoning for the change. The reclassification was met with controversy, with Florida congressman Vern Buchanan and groups such as the Save the Manatee Club and the Center for Biological Diversity expressing concerns that the change would have a detrimental effect on conservation efforts. The new classification will not affect current federal protections. West Indian manatees were originally classified as endangered with the 1967 class of endangered species.

Manatee population in the United States reached a low in the 1970s, during which only a few hundred individuals lived in the nation. As of February 2016, 6,250 manatees were reported swimming in Florida's springs. It is illegal under federal and Florida law to injure or harm a manatee.

There are many conservation programs that have been created to help manatees. Save the Manatee Club is a non-profit group and membership organization that works to protect manatees and their aquatic ecosystems.  Founded by Bob Graham, former Florida governor, and singer/songwriter Jimmy Buffett, this is today's leading manatee conservation club.

The MV Freedom Star and MV Liberty Star, ships used by NASA to tow Space Shuttle Solid Rocket Boosters back to Kennedy Space Center, were propelled only by water jets to protect the endangered manatee population that inhabits regions of the Banana River where the ships are based.

Brazil outlawed hunting in 1973 in an effort to preserve the species. Deaths by boat strikes are still common. Although countries are protecting Amazonian manatees in the locations where they are endangered, as of 1994 there were no enforced laws, and the manatees were still being captured throughout their range.

Captivity

There are a number of manatee rehabilitation centers in the United States. These include three government-run critical care facilities in Florida at Lowry Park Zoo, Miami Seaquarium, and SeaWorld Orlando. After initial treatment at these facilities, the manatees are transferred to rehabilitation facilities before release. These include the Cincinnati Zoo and Botanical Garden, Columbus Zoo and Aquarium, Epcot's The Seas, South Florida Museum, and Homosassa Springs Wildlife State Park.

The Columbus Zoo was a founding member of the Manatee Rehabilitation Partnership in 2001. Since 1999, the zoo's Manatee Bay facility has helped rehabilitate 20 manatees. The Cincinnati Zoo has rehabilitated and released more than a dozen manatees since 1999.

Manatees can also be viewed in a number of European zoos, such as the Tierpark Berlin and the Nuremberg Zoo in Germany, in ZooParc de Beauval in France, the Aquarium of Genoa in Italy and the Royal Burgers' Zoo in Arnhem, the Netherlands, where manatees have parented offspring. The River Safari at Singapore features seven of them.

The oldest manatee in captivity was Snooty, at the South Florida Museum's Parker Manatee Aquarium in Bradenton, Florida. Born at the Miami Aquarium and Tackle Company on July 21, 1948, Snooty was one of the first recorded captive manatee births. Raised entirely in captivity, Snooty was never to be released into the wild. As such he was the only manatee at the aquarium, and one of only a few captive manatees in the United States that was allowed to interact with human handlers. That made him uniquely suitable for manatee research and education.

Snooty died suddenly two days after his 69th birthday, July 23, 2017, when he was found in an underwater area only used to access plumbing for the exhibit life support system. The South Florida Museum's initial press release stated, “Early indications are that an access panel door that is normally bolted shut had somehow been knocked loose and that Snooty was able to swim in.”

Guyana 

Since the 19th century, Georgetown, Guyana has kept West Indian manatees in its botanical garden, and later, its national park.
In the 1910s and again in the 1950s, sugar estates in Guyana used manatees to keep their irrigation canals weed-free.
Between the 1950s and 1970s, the Georgetown water treatment plant used manatees in their storage canals for the same purpose.

Culture

The manatee has been linked to folklore on mermaids. In West African folklore, they were considered sacred and thought to have been once human. Killing one was taboo and required penance.

In the novel Moby-Dick, Herman Melville distinguishes manatees ("Lamatins", cf. lamatins) from small whales; stating, "I am aware that down to the present time, the fish styled Lamatins and Dugongs (Pig-fish and Sow-fish of the Coffins of Nantucket) are included by many naturalists among the whales. But as these pig-fish are a noisy, contemptible set, mostly lurking in the mouths of rivers, and feeding on wet hay, and especially as they do not spout, I deny their credentials as whales; and have presented them with their passports to quit the Kingdom of Cetology."

A manatee called Wardell appears in the Animal Crossing: New Horizons video game. He is part of a paid  downloadable content expansion, managing and selling furniture to the player.

See also 

 Dwarf manatee
 Manatee of Helena

References

Further reading

External links 

 Save the Manatee
 Murie, James On the Form and Structure of the Manatee (Manatus americanus), (1872) London, Zoological Society of London Year
 Florida Fish and Wildlife Conservation Commission 
 Reuters: Florida manatees may lose endangered status
 A website with many manatee photos
 USGS/SESC Sirenia Project
 Bibliography and Index of the Sirenia and Desmostylia – Dr. Domning's authoritative manatee research bibliography

Sirenians
Mammal families
Extant Pleistocene first appearances
Taxa named by Carl Linnaeus
Taxa named by Theodore Gill